Akkuyu (literally "white well") is a Turkic word that may refer to:

 Akkuyu, Besni, village in Adıyaman Province, Turkey
 Akkuyu, Sarıçam, village in Adana Province, Turkey

See also 
 Akkuyu Nuclear Power Plant, a planned nuclear power plant in Mersin Province, Turkey